The women's 400 metres event at the 1995 Pan American Games was held at the Estadio Atletico "Justo Roman" on 18 and 19 March.

Medalists

Results

Heats

Final

References

Athletics at the 1995 Pan American Games
1995
Pan